Ben Fransham is a New Zealand actor known for his role as Petyr in the 2014 comedy What We Do in the Shadows.

Early life and education
Fransham graduated from the New Zealand School of Dance in Wellington with a third-year scholarship diploma in 1991, and then won entry to The London Contemporary Dance School, but did not attend.

Career

In 1992, Fransham began freelance work, performing in Paul Jenden's Dance South, and touring the country with Footnote Dance Company.

He made his dramatic role debut as Rudy in Jacqueline Coats' stage production of Bent, which won a 1997 Chapmann Tripp Theatre Award for Most Original Production of the Year. Since then, he has performed in musical theatre, dramatic plays, vaudeville, puppetry, and sketch comedy shows, with increasing work in film and television.

Fransham performed in several episodes of Legend of the Seeker (2008–2010), in various featured roles of horrifying creatures. The actor has worked across multiple disciplines, including stunt performance, (e.g., with Terry Notary, in The Hobbit film trilogy, as a goblin, and with the stunt team as various orcs, goblins, humans, and elves).

In 2014, Fransham played the role of a vampire in the film What We Do in the Shadows and in 2015, he appeared in three episodes of Ash vs Evil Dead.

Selected filmography

Film

Television

References

External links
 

Year of birth missing (living people)
Living people
New Zealand male film actors